This glossary of viticultural terms list some of terms and definitions involved in growing grapes for use in winemaking.

A

B

C

D

E

F

G

H

I

J

K

L

M

N

O

P

Q

R

S

T

U

V

W

Y

Z

See also

Glossary of wine terms
Glossary of winemaking terms
Wine tasting descriptors

References

Zinfandel 
Viticulture
Viticulture
Viticulture
Wikipedia glossaries using description lists